Marcus Gleadow-Ware is the executive chef at Aureole, a Michelin starred restaurant in New York City.

Career
Ware was raised in London where he worked in various restaurants from an early age. When he was 16 years old, he began an apprenticeship under chef Anton Edelman at the Savoy Hotel.  He obtained his culinary education at the Académie Culinaire de France. He gained further experience at notable European restaurants including Cliveden House Hotel, 1 Lombard Street, L'Escargot and The Clerkenwell, where he later became head chef.

In 2007, Ware moved to New York City and was soon recruited by Charlie Palmer to join his restaurant Aureole as senior sous chef. In 2011 he became executive chef of Aureole. Charlie Palmer describes Ware as an "extremely committed and talented chef ... His passion and dedication to the culinary arts shows on each and every beautiful dish he creates."

See also
List of Michelin starred restaurants

References

External links
Aureole

Living people
American chefs
American male chefs
Head chefs of Michelin starred restaurants
People from New York City
Year of birth missing (living people)